Adamstown railway station is a station on the Dublin to Kildare Commuter service. It serves the new town of Adamstown and  South Western Commuter services call to the station.

History
It opened on 10 April 2007. It is 1.1km west of the old Lucan GSWR station which closed in 1947.

Description
The station has four through platforms and one terminal platform, and was the first Commuter station on the line (other than Dublin Heuston) to have more than two platforms. Following the completion of the Kildare Route Project, which led to the line becoming four-tracked, all platforms could be used.

The station was the first railway station in recent times to be built and paid for by private developers rather than by public money. Another Dublin railway station, Navan Road Parkway on the Western Commuter line, was built in the same way.

See also 
 List of railway stations in Ireland

References

External links
Irish Rail Adamstown Station Website
Slideshow of construction
Article on station canopy
Adamstown planning applications

Iarnród Éireann stations in South Dublin (county)
Railway stations opened in 2007